Ludwig Sesta (born 1900, date of death unknown) was an Austrian wrestler. He competed in the Greco-Roman lightweight event at the 1924 Summer Olympics. He also won a silver medal at the 1925 European Wrestling Championships.

References

External links
 

1900 births
Year of death missing
Olympic wrestlers of Austria
Wrestlers at the 1924 Summer Olympics
Austrian male sport wrestlers
Place of birth missing